Metallurg Zhlobin is an ice hockey team in Zhlobin, Belarus. The team was formed in 2004 and competes in the Belarusian Extraliga (BXL).

Winner
Belarusian Extraleague:
  - 2012, 2022
Belarusian Cup (ice hockey):
  - 2011

External links
 Official website

Ice hockey teams in Belarus
Belarusian Extraleague teams
2004 establishments in Belarus
Ice hockey clubs established in 2004